The Rural Municipality of Barrier Valley No. 397 is a rural municipality (RM) in the Canadian province of Saskatchewan within Census Division No. 14 and  Division No. 4. It is located in the east-central portion of the province.

History 
The RM of Barrier Valley No. 397 incorporated as a rural municipality on October 29, 1917. In 1924, the RM named a new Canadian Pacific Railway siding "Archerwill" using a syllabic abbreviation of councillors Archie Campbell and Ervie Hanson, and secretary-treasurer William Pierce.

Geography

Communities and localities 
The following urban municipalities are surrounded by the RM.

Villages
 Archerwill

The following unincorporated communities are within the RM.

Localities
 Algrove
 Dahlton
 Lightwoods
 McKague
 Wallwort

Demographics 

Government 
The RM of Barrier Valley No. 397 is governed by an elected municipal council and an appointed administrator that meets on the second Thursday of every month. The reeve of the RM is Wayne Black while its administrator is Glenda Smith. The RM's office is located in Archerwill. Until 1981, the RM's office was located in McKague.

Transportation 
Rail
 Wadena-to-Tisdale branch line, Canadian Pacific Railway

Roads
Highway 35—serves Archerwill, McKague, Wallwort
Highway 349—serves Archerwill, Dahlton
Highway 652—serves Archerwill
Highway 773—serves McKague

See also 
List of communities in Saskatchewan
List of rural municipalities in Saskatchewan

References 

B